Jaroslavice is a municipality and village in Znojmo District in the South Moravian Region of the Czech Republic. It has about 1,300 inhabitants.

Notable people
Anton von Winzor (1844–1910), Governor of Bosnia and Herzegovina

References

Villages in Znojmo District